Tim Coly (born 5 July 1979) is a German international rugby union player, playing for the RG Heidelberg in the Rugby-Bundesliga and the German national rugby union team.

Coly begun playing rugby in 1984 and has since played for RG Heidelberg and RC Strasbourg.

Coly only played a very limited number of matches in 2010-11, caused by work commitments, injury and the fact that he became a father but aims to play a full season in 2011-12.

Honours

Club
 German rugby union cup
 Winners: 2004

National team
 European Nations Cup - Division 2
 Champions: 2008

Stats
Tim Coly's personal statistics in club and international rugby:

Club

 As of 30 April 2012

National team

European Nations Cup

Friendlies & other competitions

 As of 8 April 2012

References

External links
 Tim Coly at scrum.com
   Tim Coly at totalrugby.com

1979 births
Living people
German rugby union players
Germany international rugby union players
Expatriate rugby union players in France
RG Heidelberg players
Rugby union hookers
German expatriate sportspeople in France
German expatriate rugby union players